Wink High School is a public high school located in Wink, Texas USA and classified as a 2A school by the UIL and serves both Wink and Mentone in Loving County. It is part of the Wink-Loving Independent School District located in southwestern Winkler County and includes all of Loving County. In 2015, the school was rated "Met Standard" by the Texas Education Agency.

Athletics
The Wink Wildcats compete in these sports 

 Boys and girls Basketball
 Boys and girls Cross Country
Football
 Boys and girls Golf
 Boys and girls Tennis
 Boys and girls Track and Field
 Girls Volleyball

State Titles
Football - 
1952(1A)
Boys Golf - 
1957(B), 1959(B), 1960(B)
Girls Golf - 
2015(1A)
Boys Track - 
1959(B)
Volleyball - 
1972(1A), 1974(1A)

Notable alumnus
Roy Orbison – Rock 'n' roll singer and songwriter, Rock and Roll Hall of Fame inductee.

Structure
In May 2018, a school bond was passed which included the demolition of the original Wink High School. In November 2018, despite the disapproval of the Texas State Historical Association, superintendent Scotty Carman and the Wink-Loving ISD school board voted to proceed with the demolition of the historic 90-year-old high school to make room for future development. Demolition began in January 2019.
Note, on the bond election 83% of the votes were for and 17% against. So it is believed to have been up to the town and not one person or persons as stated above.

See also

Recorded Texas Historic Landmarks in Winkler County

References

External links
Wink-Loving ISD

Schools in Winkler County, Texas
Public high schools in Texas
Public middle schools in Texas
Recorded Texas Historic Landmarks